The Middlesbrough Bears were a British speedway team which operated under various names from 1939 until their closure in 1996.

History
The team was initially nicknamed the Bears in 1939 by the club's general manager Vic Wieland. The track at Cleveland Park, which operated in the pioneer days of the late 1920s, was promoted by Albion Auto Racers of Stockport, Cheshire, ran sporadically throughout the 1930s and for a short spell in 1939, staged a couple of open meetings in 1945, then saw competitive league speedway from 1946 until 1948. The Bears won the Northern League in 1946 and Division Two in 1947 before the promotion moved to Newcastle in 1949. The Bears nickname was again used when the track re-opened in 1961 under the guidance of former rider turned promoter Reg Fearman, who was a multi track promoter and one of the brains behind setting up the Provincial League. At the end of the 1964 season the Bears team moved to Halifax and the track staged challenge matches in 1965 and under former captain Eric Boothroyd's promotion in 1966 before folding. The track was used in the 1950s for amateur / club events and midget car racing.

The track opened again in 1968 but were renamed the Teesside Teessiders by promoter Ron Wilson who also ran Leicester although some record books incorrectly called them Middlesbrough Teessiders. They competed in the newly formed British League Division 2. In 1973 they were again renamed, this time as the Teesside Tigers and then Middlesbrough Tigers in 1979, which after 12 years turned out to be Wilson's final season as he had opened up a new track at Milton Keynes in 1978. In 1980 Mark Courtney became British Junior Champion at Canterbury's Kingsmead Stadium whilst he and Steve Wilcock won the British League Division 2 Riders Pairs Championship at Halifax the same season. During this period they became National League Champions in 1981 and losing Knockout Cup finalists to the homeless Berwick Bandits in a controversial last heat decider at Newcastle's Brough Park with the match result dependent on the aggregate score. They won back to back National League Fours Championship in 1985/6. Individual success occurred for Gary Havelock when he became British Junior Champion at Stoke in 1985 and Grand Slam Champion at Arena Essex in 1986.  However a major arson attack on the club's main stand in June 1985 at their Cleveland Park Stadium was a catastrophe.  Initially crowds were healthy but as the years went by and the club's fortunes on track dwindled the stand was never replaced by the greyhound owners and there were yearly rumours that the land on which it stood was to be sold for redevelopment.

In 1989, the club reverted once again to the Middlesbrough Bears under a consortium until their permanent closure in 1996 when Cleveland Park was sold for re-development. The club had reached the final of the Knockout Cup in 1990 but were beaten by league champions Poole Pirates but were the only team to beat them twice that season.   The promoter in 1968 Ron Wilson had changed the name to Teesside because he wanted it to be a new beginning and to take in the whole area not just Middlesbrough.  Other promoters included Ken Knott, Wally Martin, Tim Swales & Malcolm Wright.  Three riders enjoyed testimonials with the club for their long service:  Pete Reading in 1977; Steve Wilcock in 1985 and Geoff Pusey in 1988.  Individual successes were achieved in the league's championship with Graham Plant at Hackney in 1968 and Paul Bentley at Coventry in 1994.   Andy Howe also won the inaugural Academy League Riders Championship at Long Eaton that same season.

In 2003 the Bears came back at Hull's Craven Park albeit racing in junior events against two teams from Hull and one from Scunthorpe.  They competed in the Humber League and East Riding Cup and also raced at various 'away' tracks including Belle Vue (Manchester), Buxton, Edinburgh, Glasgow, King's Lynn, Newcastle, Oxford, Scunthorpe, Sheffield & Workington.  After two years using Hull as a 'home' track they then relocated to Newcastle's Brough Park when the Newcastle Gems folded.

Redcar Bears

In 2006 a new track opened at South Tees Motorsport Park South Bank, Middlesbrough on the site of an old steelworks and entered the Premier League under the name Redcar Bears.

Notable riders

 - all round motorcyclist who competed in speedway, grasstrack, longtrack and scrambling events (motocross)

 - Speedway World Champion in 1992, he returned to the Bears in 2006 to spearhead their return to action after a 10-year wait.

 - Bears legend who spent 17 seasons with the club, later becoming team manager.

Individual honours
Graham Plant - British League Second Division Riders Champion 1968 at Hackney, London.
Paul Bentley - British League Division Two Riders Champion 1994 at Coventry, UK.
Andy Howe (ClevelandBays) - Academy League Riders Champion 1994 at Long Eaton, Nottinghamshire

Full season summary

References

Defunct British speedway teams
Sport in Middlesbrough